Thomas Shields Clarke (April 25, 1860November 15, 1920) was an American painter and sculptor. He is best known for his bronze sculpture The Cider Press, in San Francisco.

Education
Named for his grandfather, he was born in Pittsburgh, Pennsylvania, the eldest of the six children of Charles John Clarke, a Pennsylvania Railroad executive, and Louisa Semple.

He was a cartoonist for a student newspaper at Princeton University, from which he graduated in 1882. He studied for a year at the Art Students League of New York, then worked as an illustrator in New York City. He moved to Paris to study at the Académie Julian—painting under William-Adolphe Bouguereau and Jules Joseph Lefebvre; and sculpture under Henri Chapu. He was admitted to the École des Beaux-Arts, where he studied in the atelier of Jean-Léon Gérôme. Clarke left the École after less than 3 years, and became the special pupil of Pascal Dagnan-Bouveret.

Early works
Clarke exhibited his first painting at the Paris Salon of 1885, and had his first success with the wryly humorous A Fool's Fool, exhibited at the Salon of 1887. The Night Market in Morocco, an exotic scene by firelight, earned him a diploma of honor at the 1891 International Art Exhibition of Berlin, and was exhibited at the Paris Salon of 1892.

Clarke exhibited paintings at the 1893 World's Columbian Exposition in Chicago, Illinois—A Fool's Fool, The Night Market in Morocco, Portrait of Madame d' E, A Gondola Girl, and the full-size cartoon for a 3-part lunette stained glass window: Morning, Noon and Night. He was awarded a medal for his paintings.

The Cider Press

Clarke debuted a plaster sculpture group, The Cider Press, at the Paris Salon of 1892. It depicts a muscular father pressing apples while his young son samples the juice. Clarke designed it to be a public drinking fountain, with water to flow out of the press and into a bucket at its base. The Cider Press was exhibited at the 1892 Historical American Exposition in Madrid, at which King Alfonso presented Clarke with a medal (the only one awarded to a foreign sculptor). A larger-than-life-size bronze version was cast in Paris by Jaboeuf & Bezout Fondeurs, and exhibited at the 1893 World's Fair. The following year, it was exhibited at the California Midwinter International Exposition of 1894, in San Francisco. The Exposition's Executive Committee purchased the sculpture and presented it to the city. It was installed as a drinking fountain in Golden Gate Park in 1894. Vandalism caused it to be relocated to the grounds of the De Young Museum.

Later works
Clarke modeled a set of four caryatides – Spring, Summer, Autumn, Winter – for the Madison Avenue façade of the Appellate Division Courthouse of New York State, in Manhattan. He modeled a figure in staff of Captain Thomas Macdonough for the Dewey Arch, a temporary structure erected in Madison Square, Manhattan, to celebrate Admiral George Dewey's 1898 victory in the Spanish–American War. Clarke modeled an ornate bell for the gunboat USS Princeton (active 1898–1919). He modeled To Alma Mater (1900), a larger-than-life-size plaster sculpture group for his own alma mater, Princeton University, but it seems never to have been executed in bronze or marble.

Honors
Clarke was elected an associate of the National Academy of Design in 1902. George M. Reevs painted his "diploma" portrait. Clarke was a member of the National Sculpture Society, the National Arts Club, the Architectural League of New York and the Century Association.

Personal
On October 3, 1886, Clarke married Adelaide Knox, the daughter of Theodore Hand Knox and Adelaide Susan Jenney, in Geneva, Switzerland. The couple had three children: daughters Alma Adelaide Clarke and Beatrice Clarke Remington, and son Charles John Clarke, named for his grandfather and known as "Jack."

Clarke lived in Europe for 11 years, and returned with his family to the United States in 1894. He hired architect Wilson Eyre to design an Arts & Crafts-style summer house and studio, "Fernbrook," in Lenox, Massachusetts. Completed in 1904, Clarke generally worked there from May to October.

Clarke's brothers, Louis, John and James, were pioneers in automobile production. Louis Semple Clarke patented the porcelain-insulated sparkplug.

Legacy
The Pennsylvania Academy of the Fine Arts in Philadelphia owns "A Fool's Fool" (1887), and a collection of Clarke's sketches: PAFA also holds a collection of his correspondence and photographs:(PDF)

Notes

References

External links

 
 Thomas Shields Clarke, from Smithsonian Institution Research Information System
Thomas Shields Clarke

19th-century American painters
American male painters
20th-century American painters
1860 births
1920 deaths
Artists from Pittsburgh
Princeton University alumni
American alumni of the École des Beaux-Arts
Burials at Allegheny Cemetery
National Sculpture Society members
National Academy of Design associates
19th-century American male artists
20th-century American male artists